The Cadillac Allanté is a two-door, two-seater luxury roadster marketed by Cadillac from 1987 until 1993. It used a Cadillac chassis and running gear with a body built in Italy by coachbuilder Pininfarina. It was expensive to produce with the complete bodies flown to Detroit for final assembly. Over 21,000 were built during its seven-year production run.

Conception and design
To maintain luxury market position in the 1980s, Cadillac sought an aspirational model that would combine the prestige of a European design with the renown of a European coachbuilder — to help Cadillac compete with Mercedes and Jaguar. It would become the first modern-era two-passenger Cadillac roadster, and the first to wear the Cadillac name since the Cadillac Series 355 roadster of the 1930s.

Cadillac General Manager Bob Burger sent engineers in 1982 to Italy to meet with designers and coachbuilders, to explore a partnership with Cadillac.  According to program manager Ed Anderson, the team identified Pininfarina as their top choice. In fact, Cadillac subsequently chose Pininfarina to design the Allante, under the direction of Sergio Pininfarina, working with a team of designers including Mario Vernacchia. 

At GM, Chuck Jordan was torn because delegating the design to Pininfarina implied that GM's 3,000 internal designers were unable to pen the design. GM stylist Wayne Kady along with Irv Rybicki fought to have the design crafted in house, Kady later saying GM leadership had decided to go with an Italian design even before Cadillac’s designers began work. 

The in-house designers were understandably hurt and angry. Wayne Kady said to management, “we’ve done all your bread and butter cars through the years, but when it’s time to do a historic and fun project, you give it to someone else.” Cadillac General Manager Bob Burger would later tell the in-house designers the company was "looking for a car with a designer name to it. It’s like Levi's, it’s that tag on the back of the jeans."

Ostensibly, Chuck Jordan (at the time assigned in Europe with Opel) was not to examine Pininfarina's work, though because he was friends with Sergio Pininfarina he was able to see the design before it was frozen for development. As later told by Maria Vernacchia, Jordan referred to the Allanté as ‘The New Spirit of Cadillac,’ only suggesting a front grille similar to the typical Ferrari's with a classic rectangular grid design. Pininfarina subsequently opened a new facility specifically for Allanté manufacture outside Turin in rural San Giorgio Canavese, as a dedicated vehicle assembly plant, part of what would become a very long assembly process.

The car was built on a unique platform, known as the V-body, which was a shortened version of the E platform that underpinned the Cadillac Eldorado and other contemporary personal luxury coupes.

The nameplate Allanté was selected by General Motors from 1,700 computer generated potential names. Originally designed to compete with the Mercedes-Benz SL and Jaguar XJS, the Allanté initially featured a slightly modified variant of the 4.1 L V8 used across Cadillac's model line. This was expanded to 4.5 L in 1989, and upgraded to the 4.6 L L37 Northstar in its final year, 1993.

All Allanté models featured a fully electronic instrument and control panel, which was angled towards the driver, without knobs or manual controls. General Motors (GM) also implemented electronic controls in select premium mid-to-late 1980s luxury vehicles such as the Buick Reatta, Buick Riviera, and Oldsmobile Toronado Trofeo, although these vehicles included a touchscreen control panel called the Graphic Control Center (GCC), which the Allanté did not.

Air Bridge production

The Allanté incorporated an international production arrangement similar to the early 1950s Nash-Healey two-passenger sports car. The Allanté bodies were designed and manufactured in Italy by Pininfarina and were shipped  to the U.S. for final assembly with domestically manufactured chassis and engine, eventually leading it to be referred to as "the world's longest assembly line." Specially equipped Boeing 747s departed from Turin International Airport with 56 bodies at a time, arriving at Detroit's Coleman A. Young International Airport about 3 miles northeast of Cadillac's new Hamtramck Assembly plant, known as the "Allanté Air Bridge". The expensive shipping process stemmed from GM's recent closing of Fisher Body Plant #18, which had supplied Cadillac bodies since 1921. It was not the first time that Cadillac joint-ventured with Pininfarina, having subcontracted body production for the 1959 Eldorado Brougham and design and coachworks for several one-offs, customs, and concept cars.

Model Year changes

1987

The front-wheel drive Allanté roadster featured a transverse multi-port fuel injected variant of GM's aluminum  HT-Cadillac 4100 V8, along with roller valve lifters, high-flow cylinder heads, and a tuned intake manifold. The suspension was independent strut front and rear, with Bosch ABS III four-wheel disc brakes. A removable aluminum hardtop, Delco-GM/Bose Symphony Sound System (a $905 option on other Cadillacs), the industry's first power retractable AM/FM/Cellular Telephone antenna, and a complex lamp-out module that substituted an adjacent lamp for a burned-out bulb in the exterior lighting system until the dead one could be replaced were all standard. The only option was a cellular telephone, installed in a lockable center console. The base price was $54,700 ($ in  dollars ).

1988
For 1988, the Allanté featured revised front seat headrests and a power decklid pulldown as standard equipment. Analog instruments, in place of the standard digital dash cluster, were also now available as a no-charge option. The base price was raised to $56,533, with the cellular telephone still the only extra-cost option. In a comparison test by Popular Science magazine, the 1988 Allanté was ranked behind the Mercedes 560 SL, but ahead of the brand new Buick Reatta.

1989

In 1989, the base price rose to $57,183. Unlocking the trunk also unlocked the side doors if the key was rotated twice – similar to Mercedes-Benz and BMW. As a theft-deterrent, Allanté added GM's Pass Key (Personal Automotive Security System), using a resistor pellet within the ignition key to render the fuel system and starter inoperative if an incorrect ignition key was used. Allanté also received a new speed-sensitive damper system called Speed Dependent Damping Control, or SD²C. The firmest setting was also used when starting from a standstill until . Another change was a variable-assist steering system.

1990

In 1990, Cadillac offered a lower-priced ($53,050) companion model with a cloth convertible roof and without the removable aluminum hardtop, and a model including the hardtop at $58,638. By midyear, prices were dropped to $57,813 for the hardtop/convertible and $51,500 for the convertible, which included a $650 Gas Guzzler Tax along with a $550 destination charge. The fully integrated cellular telephone, which was equipped from the factory on just 36 cars this year, was available for an additional $1,195. Allanté owners also received a special toll-free number to call for service or concerns. Headlamp washers and dual 10-way Recaro seating remained standard. A driver's side airbag was added to the leather-wrapped steering wheel, eliminating the telescoping steering wheel — which retained its tilt feature. The analog instrument cluster – introduced the previous year – was standard on the convertible (available at no extra cost on the hardtop/convertible), with a total of 358 cars equipped with the analog cluster. 

The power mirror control moved from the right of the steering column on the instrument panel to a new location on the upper end of the driver's door armrest, while the power seat switches (previously mounted on the face of the seat base) were relocated to the lower side trim of the seat base facing the door panels. The 3-channel garage door opener base mounted on the header panel above the windshield was eliminated when a new sun visor design was introduced this year. Traction control was added – the first front-wheel drive automobile with a V8 to be equipped as such. The system was designed to cut fuel to up to four cylinders to reduce power and optimize traction. 

Previously, they entered "normal" mode after just . A revised audio system allowed a CD player to be added as standard equipment, along with the cassette player. Of the 2,523 built for 1990, only five were exported – four to Canada and one to Germany. Allanté was available in eight colors this year, the most popular was Euro Red, found on 1,012 cars, while the least chosen was Gray Metallic, with only 28 made. Interior color choices (and production figures) were Charcoal Gray (1,343), Natural Beige (767), and Maroon (413).

1991

In 1991, Cadillac added a power-latching mechanism for the convertible top and redesigned the top stowage cover mechanism to address customer complaints. The Bose stereo system was upgraded to 200 watts, and the digital instrument cluster, featured in all but 275 Allanté models this year, was repriced (it was now a $495 option for the convertible model). Prices began at $57,260, although a midyear price drop brought the Allanté convertible down to $55,900, and the hardtop/convertible down to $61,450 (from $62,810). Allanté had 16.3 cubic feet of storage (when using the pass-through compartment into the cabin area). Of the 1,928 models produced for 1991, only seven were manufactured for export – five to Canada, one to Italy, and another to Puerto Rico. Canadian models offered a kilometer-based instrument cluster, daytime running lamps, and an engine block heater as standard equipment, while the Italian model featured a list of European-mandated modifications, including breakaway side mirrors, specific European headlamps and turn signals, a front tow hook, rear fog lamps, deletion of the deck-lid mounted center brake light, a wet-arm windshield washer system, coolers for the power steering and automatic transmission fluids, and a revised steering column to compensate for the removal of the driver's airbag.

1992
The Allanté for 1992 was priced at $58,470 for the convertible and $64,090 for the hardtop/convertible. Both prices included the mandated gas guzzler tax, which was now at $1,300. As it had been the custom for a few years now, price drops were announced midyear, $57,170 for the convertible, and $62,790 with the removable hardtop. The optional digital cluster was priced at $495 (available at no charge on the removable hardtop model), however, only 187 cars were equipped with the standard analog cluster this year. Also available on the convertible at extra cost was a pearl white paint group (option YL3) priced at $700 (a total of 443 made during 1992). 1992 was the last year of the multi-adjustable Recaro seating design.  Of the 1,698 produced this year, four were specifically built for export, all to Canada. As with the previous year, the most popular exterior was 47U – Euro Red with 549  units, while the least popular was 49U – Light Blue Metallic with a total of 15 finished in that color. Three shades of leather were available for the interior, the colors and their production totals: Charcoal (859), Natural Beige (652), Maroon (187), (50) Polo Green, and one Pearl Flax, (O4U).

1993

For model year 1993, the Allanté was offered in a single model configuration: as a soft-top convertible priced at $59,975 (not including a mandatory $1,700 gas guzzler tax for vehicles sold in the United States). Options included the removable  aluminum hardtop, LCD digital instrument cluster ($495) in place of the standard analog instruments, pearl coat paint option ($700, in Flax or Canyon Yellow, with Hawaiian Orchid added midyear) and chrome squeeze-cast aluminum wheels.

A new unequal-length control arm rear suspension, shared with the Seville and Eldorado, was introduced. To offset increased costs, the 200-watt Bose stereo was dropped in favor of GM's Delco "Premium Symphony Sound System"; the intelligent lighting module was eliminated; and 1993 models featured less expensive Lear-designed eight-way dual power seats, replacing the previous Recaro seats. Interior changes included the addition of an auto-dimming rearview mirror and a revised shifter grip. Other model year changes included Road Sensing Suspension, an active damper management system, revised disc brakes, revised variable-assist power steering rack, deeper front spoiler, and single-piece side windows, which eliminated the stationary forward vent window. 

The 1993 Allanté was also chosen as the 1992 pace car for the 76th Indianapolis 500, the pace car was driven by Bobby Unser. Three modified 1993 Allanté Pace Cars had only seat belts, lighted roll bar, and air intake modified from a stock production Allanté's. The three Allanté Pace cars were provided for the race, as well as 30 stock 1993 Allanté's used as Festival/Pace Cars, and 58 stock 1992 Allanté Festival/Pace cars that were used by drivers and crews at the opening parade and the closing of the race. Al Unser Jr's 1993 Allanté Festival/Pace car was featured at both the 2012, and 2013 Keel's & Wheel's Concours D’Elegance in Seabrook, Texas, Bobby Unser was Grand Marshal in 2012, and Al Unser Jr was Grand Marshal in 2013.

Production reached 4,670 for model year 1993 with 115 for export – France (1), Austria (2), Belgium (5), Germany (5), Switzerland (6), Japan (11), and Canada (85).

Discontinuation
Despite a scheduled facelift for the model, the last Allanté built was flown from Turin, Italy on July 2, 1993, and completed at Detroit-Hamtramck 14 days later. With 21,430 built, assemblies averaged just a little more than 3,000 a year throughout the car's lifetime. Production officially ended on July 16, 1993.

Specifications

Production numbers

Pininfarina production records states 21,395 bodies made from 1986 to 1993.

See also
Chrysler TC by Maserati

References

External links

1990–1993 Cadillac Allanté: Overview
The National Cadillac Allanté club

Allante
Roadsters
Convertibles
1990s cars
Cars introduced in 1986
Pininfarina
Front-wheel-drive sports cars
Cars discontinued in 1993